The 1989–90 DDR-Oberliga was the 41st season of the DDR-Oberliga, the first tier of league football in East Germany. It was the last season of the league under the name of DDR-Oberliga as it played as the NOFV-Oberliga in the following season. East Germany saw great political change during the 1989–90 season with the opening of borders in October 1989, free elections in March 1990 and the eventual German reunification later in the year.

The league was contested by fourteen teams. Dynamo Dresden won the championship, the club's last out of eight East German championships.

Torsten Gütschow of Dynamo Dresden was the league's top scorer with 18 goals, while Ulf Kirsten, also of Dynamo Dresden, took out the seasons East German Footballer of the year award.

On the strength of the 1989–90 title Dynamo Dresden qualified for the 1990–91 European Cup where the club was knocked out by Red Star Belgrade in the quarter finals. Second-placed FC Karl-Marx-Stadt qualified for the 1990–91 UEFA Cup where it was knocked out by Borussia Dortmund in the first round while third-placed 1. FC Magdeburg lost to Girondins de Bordeaux in the second round. With Dynamo Dresden having won the double the losing cup finalist, Dynamo Schwerin, playing in the tier two DDR-Liga, took part in the 1990–91 European Cup Winners' Cup where it was knocked out in the first round by FK Austria Wien.

During the season Berliner FC Dynamo was renamed to FC Berlin, BSG Wismut Aue was renamed to FC Wismut Aue and BSG Stahl Eisenhüttenstadt became Eisenhüttenstädter FC Stahl while further name changes followed in the off-season. As another sign of the changes in East Germany players were, for the first time, allowed to transfer to western clubs during the 1989–90 seasons. Andreas Thom was the first, leaving BFC Dynamo for Bayer 04 Leverkusen in December 1989, followed by others which, while financially lucrative, left DDR-Oberliga clubs like Dynamo weakened.

Table									
The 1989–90 season saw two newly promoted clubs, Eisenhüttenstädter FC Stahl and BSG Fortschritt Bischofswerda.

Results

Top goalscorers
The seasons top scorers:

Championship-winning squad

References

Sources

External links
 Das Deutsche Fussball Archiv  Historic German league tables

Ober
1989-90
1